Christopher Bosch (born ) is a South African professional rugby union player for Bourgoin-Jallieu in the Fédérale 1 in France. His regular position is centre.

Rugby career

Schoolboy rugby

Bosch was born in Pretoria, but later moved to the Western Cape to finish his schooling at Paarl Gimnasium. In 2010, he was selected to represent Western Province at the Under-18 Academy Week held in Vryheid.

2011–2013: Blue Bulls

After school, Bosch moved back to Pretoria, joining the  academy. He made fourteen appearances for the Under-19 team during the 2011 Under-19 Provincial Championship, starting eleven of those matches in the inside centre position. He scored four tries during the regular season – one each in their matches against the s and the s and two in their final match against the s – to help the Blue Bulls finish top of the log to qualify for the title play-offs. He started their semi-final match against , scoring a try just after the hour mark in a 48–13 victory, as well as the final, which trans--Jukskei rivals  won 20–19.

Bosch advanced to the  squad for the 2012 season, emulating his try-scoring form from 2011 by contributing five tries during the season. These tries came in home and away victories over the s, home and away victories over the s and their match against the s in Potchefstroom. The team won ten of their twelve matches in the regular season – with Bosch featuring in nine of their matches – to top the log and advance to the semi-finals. Bosch was used as a replacement in their 46–35 victory over the Sharks in the semi-final and their 22–13 victory over Western Province in the final as his side won the competition for the second consecutive season.

He came on as a replacement in the 53rd minute of the match to make his first class debut, helping the Blue Bulls to a 110–0 victory.

He again represented the Blue Bulls' Under-21 side in the latter half of the season. He didn't feature in the play-offs though, where the Blue Bulls followed up a 36–13 semi-final victory over the Sharks with a defeat in the final, going down 23–30 to Western Province.

2014: Boland Cavaliers

Bosch spent his 2014 season playing for the Wellington-based . Two starts and two appearances as a replacement followed, as Boland finished in sixth place on the Southern Section log, missing out on the play-offs. He made just two appearances off the bench during their Currie Cup qualification series, which saw the team progress to the First Division. He featured in three more matches in that competition, but could not prevent the side finishing in fifth, missing out on a play-off spot.

2015: Falcons

He started five matches for them in the 2015 Currie Cup qualification series, and a further three times in the First Division. He scored his first senior try in their match against his former side , as his new side convincingly beat them 76–12.

2016: Boland Cavaliers

Bosch rejoined the Boland Cavaliers for the 2016 season and established himself as the first-choice inside centre, starting thirteen matches in that position. The Boland Cavaliers won eleven of their fourteen matches to finish in third position on the log to qualify for the Premier Division for the first time since 2009.

References

South African rugby union players
Living people
1992 births
Rugby union players from Pretoria
Rugby union centres
Blue Bulls players
Boland Cavaliers players
Falcons (rugby union) players